Segger may refer to:
Segger Microcontroller Systems
Segger (surname)
A common misspelling for saggar, a protective kiln implement